Ocinara albiceps is a moth in the family Bombycidae. It was described by Francis Walker in 1862. It is found in Sundaland. The habitat consists of lowland areas, especially alluvial forests, as well as the lower montane zone.

The wingspan is 20–34 mm. The ground colour is pale yellow with greyish-brown markings, including an oblique medial band.

Subspecies
Ocinara albiceps albiceps
Ocinara albiceps obscurata Dierl, 1978 (Java)

References

Bombycidae
Moths described in 1862